Kaywin Feldman is an American museum administrator and director of the National Gallery of Art in Washington, D.C. Named on December 11, 2018, Feldman took over from Earl A. Powell III in March 2019. She is the National Gallery of Art's first woman director.

Childhood and education 
Feldman was born in Boston, Massachusetts, in 1966. Feldman's father was in the military, and the family moved often. They lived in or near Boston; Cleveland, Ohio; Washington, D.C. (she attended high school in Silver Spring, Maryland), and London in the United Kingdom.<ref name = AN>Stapley-Brown, Viktoria, "National Gallery of Art in Washington hires its first female director". The Art Newspaper, December 11, 2018.</ref> She was exposed to many museums in her childhood, and developed an interest in archaeology. She obtained a bachelor's degree in classical archaeology from the University of Michigan and a master's degree from the Institute of Archaeology of the University of London. She also obtained a master's in art history from the University of London's Courtauld Institute of Art, writing her thesis on 16th-century Flemish art with a particular focus on representations of satyrs."Kaywin Feldman". Minneapolis Institute of Arts.  While studying in London she worked at the British Museum.

 Professional career 
When she was 28, Feldman became director of the Fresno Metropolitan Museum of Art and Science.  From 1999 until 2007 Feldman was director of the Memphis Brooks Museum of Art.  In 2008 she became director and president of the Minneapolis Institute of Art. During her tenure, she expanded the collection and attendance doubled.  Digital access was emphasized, and social justice and equity programs were adopted.McGlone, Peggy, "The National Gallery of Art will have a female director for the first time in its history", The Washington Post, December 11, 2018.  Upon being selected by the National Gallery, she resigned her offices at the Minneapolis Institute with her last day set on March 1, 2019, and assumed her new position in Washington ten days later. She is the NGA's first woman director.

Feldman previously served as president of the Association of Art Museum Directors and as chair of the American Alliance of Museums.

Views on women in the arts and in art museum professions

On February 4, 2020, Feldman participated in a public conversation at the Brooklyn Museum titled "Women Leaders in the Arts" during which she made the claim that "art museums, the arts, and arts faculties at universities" have become "so predominantly filled with women" that hiring men in these fields is now a priority for the sake of diversity. She added that "of course all studies show that when a profession becomes 'pink-collared,' whether you wear a pink collar or not, salaries go down." Feldman made these assertions despite a 2014 report by the Association of Art Museum Directors (AAMD) and the National Center for Arts Research (NCAR) which "found that a gender gap existed in art museum directorships... that women held less than half of directorships, that the average female director’s salary lagged behind that of the average male director, and that these phenomena were most persistent in the largest museums." A second report in 2017 found that, "despite press attention and field-wide dialogue on the topic, the gender gap persists."

References

External links
 Platt, Adam, "Modernizing Mia: A Q&A with Kaywin Feldman".  MinnPost, February 16, 2018.
 Espeland, Pamela, "National Gallery lucky to get Kaywin Feldman". MinnPost'', December 12, 2018.

Directors of museums in the United States
Living people
National Gallery of Art
20th-century American archaeologists
American women archaeologists
University of Michigan College of Literature, Science, and the Arts alumni
Alumni of the UCL Institute of Archaeology
Alumni of the Courtauld Institute of Art
Women museum directors
20th-century women writers
1966 births
20th-century American women
21st-century American women